The Malayan partridge, or Campbell's partridge, (Arborophila campbelli) is a bird species in the family Phasianidae. This species is found in highland forest in Peninsular Malaysia. It is sometimes treated as a subspecies of the grey-breasted partridge.

References

Malayan partridge
Birds of the Malay Peninsula
Malayan partridge